Shubigi Rao (born 1975) is an Indian-born Singaporean contemporary artist and writer known for her long-term, multidisciplinary projects and installation works that often use books, etchings, drawings, video, and archives. Her interests include archaeology, libraries, neuroscience, histories and lies, literature and violence, and natural history. Rao has exhibited internationally, presenting work at the 59th Venice Biennale in 2022, 10th AsiaPacific Triennial in 2021, 10th Taipei Biennial in 2016, the 3rd Pune Biennale in 2017, the 2nd Singapore Biennale in 2008, as well as the 4th Kochi-Muziris Biennale in 2018.

In 2018, Rao received the Juror's Choice Award at the APB Foundation Signature Art Prize for her work, Written in the Margins (2014–2016), the first instalment of her ongoing 10-year project on the destruction of books and libraries, titled Pulp: A Short Biography of the Banished Book. In August 2020 Rao won the Singapore Literature Prize in Creative Nonfiction for her book, Pulp II: A Visual Bibliography of the Banished Book. The first volume from the Pulp project was also shortlisted for the Singapore Literature Prize in 2018.

Rao will curate the fifth edition of South Asia's biggest visual arts event, the Kochi-Muziris Biennale, which was initially planned to take place from December 2020 to April 2021, before being postponed to 2022 due to COVID-19. Alongside Kochi-Muziris Biennale founder and artist Bose Krishnamachari, Rao was featured on the 2019 and 2020 editions of the ArtReview Power 100 list, which charts the most influential individuals working in contemporary art.

In 2022, Rao represented Singapore at the 59th Venice Biennale with the project Pulp III: A Short Biography of The Banished Book, with Ute Meta Bauer as curator for the artistic team.

Education and personal life 
Rao was born in 1975 in Mumbai, and is currently based in Singapore. In 1996, Rao obtained her Bachelor of Arts (Honours) in English Literature from the University of Delhi. She would later obtain her Diploma in Fine Arts, Bachelor of Fine Arts (First Class) and Master of Fine Arts (First Class) from LASALLE College of the Arts, Singapore in 2005, 2006, and 2008 respectively.

She previously lectured part-time in Art Theory and was a MFA Dissertation supervisor for the Faculty of Fine Arts at LASALLE College of the Arts.

Career 
From 2003 to 2013, Rao assumed the role of a fictitious male scientist named S. Raoul and presented his work at scientific conferences and group art exhibitions. Rao "killed him off" in a 2013 solo show at the Institute of Contemporary Arts Singapore, The Retrospectacle of S. Raoul, which memorialised him after he supposedly tripped over an installation by Rao and died. The exhibition assembled some of Rao's works from the past 10 years that was based around the figure of Raoul. The exhibition was accompanied by the publication, History's Malcontents: The Life And Times of S. Raoul, which served both as a guide to the character of Raoul, and to a selection of Rao’s works beyond the show itself.

In 2014, Rao initiated her currently ongoing 10-year project on the destruction of books and libraries, Pulp: A Short Biography of the Banished Book. In 2016, as an artist-in-residence at the NTU Centre for Contemporary Art Singapore, Rao self-published the first book from her project, also titled Pulp: A Short Biography of the Banished Book. The book was later nominated for the 2018 Singapore Literature Prize. It would also be included in '50 Greatest Works of SingLit', a list of the greatest books of Singaporean literature from the 19th century to the present day. 

From June 2016 to May 2017, as an international artist-in-residence at Künstlerhaus Bethanien, Berlin, Rao would develop the first instalment of the Pulp project, Written in the Margins (2014–2016). In 2018, she would receive the Juror's Choice Award at the APB Foundation Signature Art Prize for Written in the Margins. In August 2018 at Objectifs, Singapore, Rao would hold the solo exhibition, The Wood for the Trees, which functioned as a "visual bibliography" of the various texts, individuals, and sites Rao had encountered in the duration of her ongoing Pulp project. Here, she would launch the second volume of her project, titled Pulp II: A Visual Bibliography of the Banished Book.

During the fourth edition of the Kochi-Muziris Biennale from December 2018 to March 2019, Rao was Singapore's sole representative, presenting a video installation that constructed a fictive history of book smugglers in the Indian port city.

In February 2019, Rao exhibited alongside American actress and artist Lucy Liu in a joint exhibition at the National Museum of Singapore, Unhomed Belongings.

In May 2019, it was announced that Rao would curate the fifth edition of the Kochi-Muziris Biennale. Alongside Kochi-Muziris Biennale founder and artist Bose Krishnamachari, Rao was featured on the 2019 edition of the ArtReview Power 100 list, which charts the most influential individuals working in contemporary art. Titled "In our Veins Flow Ink and Fire," its first announced artist list involved 25 participating artists and collectives. She would be featured alongside Krishnamachari on the ArtReview Power 100 list once again in 2020.

In August 2020 Rao won the Singapore Literature Prize in Creative Nonfiction for her second volume from the Pulp project, Pulp II: A Visual Bibliography of the Banished Book. The judging panel, comprising Clarissa Oon, Eddie Tay and Sarah Churchwell, commented: “Probing, exhaustive in its global scope, intellectually ambitious and deeply felt, the second volume in artist-writer Shubigi Rao’s decade-long documentary project on reading, libraries and censorship gets to the heart of what ‘creative non-fiction’ can be. As a book on the value of books, rendered through incisive prose and visual imagery, it provokes the whole question of what a book is, in terms of form. In terms of content, it is replete with insight and wisdom, constantly shifting our expectations of the subject matter and in the process, able to stand with the best in world literature."

Rao represented Singapore with 'Pulp III' at the Singapore Pavilion for the 59th Venice Biennale in 2022, with Ute Meta Bauer serving as curator for the artistic team. Her work  was listed as one of the best national pavilions by Artsy, The Arts Newspaper, and Weltkunst among others, and garnered significant media and public attention.

Art

S. Raoul 
As part of her projects from 2003 to 2013, Rao assumed the identity of S. Raoul, a fictional archaeologist, scientist, and theorist, whose interests spanned immortal jellyfish to the risks of brain damage posed by contemporary art. Rao's interests were expressed through the persona of Raoul, which included archaeological studies of contemporary Singapore in works such as The Study of Leftovers, Pseudoscience in Suitcase, and Earth=Unearth.

Originally commissioned for the 2008 Singapore Biennale, The Tuning Fork of the Mind involves a tongue-in-cheek brain scan conducted through a series of steps that revealed the supposedly damaging effects of exposure to contemporary art upon one's brain.

Pulp 
Initiated in 2014, Pulp: A Short Biography of the Banished Book is Rao's current ongoing 10-year film, book, and visual art project, with Rao visiting various collections both public and private, libraries, and archives internationally for research. The project examines the history of book destruction, censorship, and various other forms of repression, conceiving of the book as a symbol of resistance, focusing on instances such as the 1992 shelling of Sarajevo's national library.

The first instalment of the project, Written in the Margins (2014–2016), was presented at the Künstlerhaus Bethanien, Berlin in 2016 and the APB Foundation Signature Art Prize exhibition in Singapore in 2018. This installation featured drawings, books, and an interactive archive of video testimonials from activists and individuals involved in saving or destroying books, such as Firefighters who attempted to save the burning national library of Sarajevo during civil unrest in the 1990s, or smugglers of books and paintings who brought these objects to safety during that period. Three of five planned volumes of books have been published for the project, the first being Pulp: A Short Biography of the Banished Book, the second, Pulp II: A Visual Bibliography of the Banished Book', and the third Pulp III: An Intimate Inventory of the Banished Book'.'

 Awards 
In 2020, Rao won the Singapore Literature Prize 2020 (Creative Nonfiction) for her book Pulp II: A Visual Bibliography of the Banished Book. Rao also won the Juror's Choice Award at the APB Foundation Signature Art Prize 2018 for the first instalment of the Pulp project, Written in the Margins'' (2014–2016). Rao has also been commissioned by Singapore's Land Transport Authority to develop a public artwork for the Stevens interchange on the upcoming Thomson–East Coast MRT line. She has been awarded the Creation Grant (2019, 2013), and the Presentation Grant (2018, 2013, 2012), from the National Arts Council Singapore, and was awarded the Winston Oh Travel Award in 2005.

Selected exhibitions and projects 

Some of the information in the table above was obtained from Shubigi Rao's artist CV from 21 February 2016, archived and accessed on 27 July 2020.

References

Further reading

External links 

 Shubigi Rao's website
 Kochi-Muziris Biennale 2020 curator

1975 births
21st-century Singaporean women writers
Living people
LASALLE College of the Arts alumni
Singaporean artists
Singaporean installation artists
Singaporean people of Indian descent
Singaporean women artists
Singaporean women writers
Delhi University alumni